New York's 78th State Assembly district is one of the 150 districts in the New York State Assembly. It has been represented by George Alvarez since 2023, defeating then-incumbent Jose Rivera.

Geography
District 78 is located in The Bronx, containing the neighborhoods of Kingsbridge Heights, portions of Fordham, Bedford Park, and Belmont.

Recent election results

2022

2020

2018

2016

2014

2012

2010

2008

References

78